Garraree is a townland in County Westmeath, Ireland.

Garraree is one of 11 townlands of the civil parish of Tyfarnham in the barony of Corkaree in the Province of Leinster.

The neighbouring townlands are: Parsonstown to the north, Knockatee to the east, Knockdrin to the south and Kilmaglish to the west.

In the 1911 census of Ireland there were 2 houses and 8 inhabitants in the townland.

References

External links
Map of Garraree at openstreetmap.org
Garraree at the IreAtlas Townland Data Base
Garraree at Townlands.ie
Garraree at The Placenames Database of Ireland

Townlands of County Westmeath